The Cube is an hour-long teleplay that aired on NBC's weekly anthology television show NBC Experiment in Television in 1969. The production was produced and directed by puppeteer and filmmaker Jim Henson, and was one of several experiments with the live-action film medium which he conducted in the 1960s, before focusing entirely on The Muppets and other puppet works. The screenplay was co-written by long-time Muppet writer Jerry Juhl. The program was recorded in Toronto and aired later the same month.
In the previous year, Henson had produced a documentary for NBC Experiment in Television, "Youth '68".

The teleplay only aired twice: first on February 23, 1969, with a rerun on February 21, 1971.

Plot

An unnamed man, simply called "The Man in the Cube", is trapped in a cube-like white room as he asks if anyone can hear him. A stool is brought in by a maintenance man named Arnie who discovers it covered in strawberry jam as he wipes it down. After Arnie leaves, the Man tries to find the door. He encounters a variety of people come through various hidden doors in which each one claim that he can get out through his own door.

His first visitor is a woman named Margaret who claims that the man is her husband Ted as she appears with parents are also present. Her door closes on the Man before she can get him out.

The Man then meets Mr. Thomas, the manager of this entire establishment. When asked about the Cube, Mr. Thomas states that he has asked himself that question many times where it is too good to be true. Mr. Thomas shows the Man the Call Button that he should push if he ever needs anything. Mr. Thomas then works to deny the fact that there are other Cubes like this while stating that while some people are quite content and stay in the Cube, others would wish to leave. As Mr. Thomas leaves, he tells the Man that he must find his own door.

Arnie returns again where he gives the Man a telephone and states that he can get him anything he wants. Arnie exclaims that the only trouble with this establishment is that there is no organization and The Man wouldn't believe the weirdos that run it. He also talks about the four tons of chocolate rabbits while mentioning that he's been working here for 14 years where there hasn't been a request for chocolate rabbits. As Arnie goes outside to call the Man to see if the telephone is working, the Man sees a brief opening until the telephone rings and Mr. Thomas briefly appears to give the receiver to him before leaving. The Man answers it and Arnie tells him that the telephone is in business. The Man discovers that his telephone only calls up Arnie. When the Man throws it towards the wall, Arnie opens it as it flies through as Arnie rewards his accuracy by giving him a chocolate rabbit.

Two police officers consisting of a police sergeant and Officer Fritz from the MPD enter with a search warrant. They find different things in the panels of the Cube like smuggled diamonds in the chocolate rabbit, a stack of gold bullion from the Bank of Munich, vital plans of the X-74 (which was classified top secret), microfilm documenting the entire National Security System, an arsenal (consisting of machine guns, sten guns, dynamite), and a bound and gagged Dr. Kingsley (who was missing for two weeks as part of a ransom). The Man is then handcuffed by the police sergeant in an uncomfortable way as the police officers leave with everything while telling the Man to wait until they return.

A house painter and decorator named Miss Bix comes in while the Man tries to get out of his handcuffs as Arnie comes in with the mustard paint in order to decorate the Cube. She then changes her mind and wants tangerine paint as the Man struggles to get his leg out from the position the handcuffs have him in. Upon trying to hold back the info on how long the Man will be in the Cube, Miss Bix changes her mind about the paint and has shellac sprayed onto the already white Cube as she leaves. Arnie states to the Man that he is actually spraying deodorant and that Miss Bix can't tell the difference. Before leaving, Arnie stops the Man from following him since this is Arnie's door.

A guitarist comes in and gives the Man the keys to the handcuffs which frees the Man. Upon finding a bed that manifested, the Man rests on it while the guitarist practices his music. The guitarist is then joined by the rest of his band as they sing a song to the Man about never getting out of the Cube. After the band leaves, Mr. Thomas briefly enters telling the Man that the "Rest Period" is over.

A prisoner named Watson enters the Cube having escaped from his Cube. He notices that the Man hasn't been here for long while mentioning how his Cube had squares while the Man's Cube has rectangles. Watson tells the Man that he had to tell how many times has passed by making marks in his thumbnail which didn't work when he lost his thumbnails. Watson decides to return to his Cube to see if he left anything behind. When the Man states that if he re-enters his Cube where he won't get out again, Watson ranted about having to depend on the squares. Watson decides to go back to his Cube. When Mr. Thomas enters asking if someone else was in his Cube, the Man states that there was a visitor. Mr. Thomas states that other visitor was acting and introduces him to Jack Van Evera who asks Mr. Thomas if they can take out the part about the thumbnails. As they leave, Jack asks Mr. Thomas what the rest of these Cubes are for anyway. Before leaving, Mr. Thomas states "He was only kidding. You know that."

A seductress named Cora enters as a couch and a liquor cabinet suddenly appear. Cora states that she always comes to the Cube. The Man sits down on the couch. As they make out, a physician named Dr. Bradowski enters with Dr. Bingham (Moe Margolese) and a nurse (Jean Christopher) run some medical tests on the Man while Cora leaves. The doctors tell the Man his results before leaving to tend to a platypus.

A professor enters stating that him being here is either part of a teleplay or he's hallucinating. He even shows him the ending with him in the Cube with a girl before leaving.

A black militant (Don Crawford) enters where he finds the Man's Cube is all white thinking that it's a mausoleum for whiteness while claiming that the Man will die in the Cube. The Man claims that this isn't his place and had nothing to do with the Cube's construction. When the black militant wants the Man to go out the door, the Man states that he can't since it's the black militant's door. The black militant then leaves quoting "You make me sick".

A classy party manifests in the Man's cube. When Mr. Thomas arrives offering tonic to the guests, the Man tries to get some only to be blocked by a barrier. A female partygoer named Mrs. Stratton (Alice Hill) exclaims that Mr. Thomas is projected and states that nobody having a party in the Man's Cube is real. The image of the party then disappears as it shows the Man on his stool.

After a panel briefly opens where an old man asks if he has considered that he is dead and this is what his afterlife is like, the Man is visited by a scientist who asks the Man to define reality for him. When the Man claims that the hammer doesn't exist, the scientist proves him wrong by throwing the hammer at one of the cube's walls causing a hole in it. Arnie reprimands the scientist for breaking the wall and gives him his hammer back while he gets the wall fixed. Upon being unable to convince the Man, the scientist leaves hoping that the Man rots in the Cube. Arnie fixes the hole and leaves stating that the scientist is a real pain in the neck.

A woman named Liza enters where she gives the Man a hint on how to get out which is "it's going to get worse before it gets better". Her other hint is "don't trust anybody" as she turns into an elderly-like appearance. After she leaves, Mr. Thomas enters stating that the Man's time is up and that he must leave. As the Man tries to leave through the door that Mr. Thomas claims to be the Man's door, the Man has his suspicions in which if he steps out the door, two gorillas in ballerina dresses would grab him, drag him back into the cube, throw him to the ground, and dance around him singing "Home! Sweet Home!" The Man attempts to step out and is assaulted by the ballerina-dressed gorillas (depicted as two men in gorilla suits) in the manner that he described where they substitute "home" with "the Cube." Mr. Thomas leaves stating that the Man is getting pretty good at predicting these things.

Two comics and enter and tell jokes to the audience. They then turn their attention to the Man when they find that he wasn't joining in on the laughter. The Man stated that he just didn't feel like laughing. The comics then laugh at the Man before leaving.

A kid on a tricycle rides around the Cube mocking the Man stating that he's never going to get out of the Cube and then leaves.

A monk enters and disperses his wisdom onto the Man while stating that he is part of the "All." Before leaving, the monk gives the Man an orb called the Ramadar which is supposed to hold the meaning of life. After the monk leaves, the Ramadar only makes a grinding noise. The Man smashes it with the stool to find that inexplicably it is made of strawberry jam inside. Arnie comes in and cleans up the broken Ramadar stating that most people break their Ramadar. Arnie then leaves with the broken Ramadar and the broken stool. After six people bring in a coffin, the Man finds a gun is left in the room. Grabbing the gun, the man attempts to shoot himself and ink squirts onto his face.

All the people he had encountered enter and laugh at him as Arnie states that this is all a joke. Enraged, he tells them he's had enough with their tricks and that no matter what happens he knows he is real. The Man then leaves the Cube as the people applaud him. The Man is then escorted into an office so that the head of the organization can sign his release. Once there, the Man reflects on the revelation of his own realness. He accidentally cuts himself with a knife while demonstrating and is asked to taste his blood. He does so and discovers his blood is strawberry jam. The head of the organization and his office fade away to reveal the Man is still trapped in the cube.

As the credits roll, the Man wanders around the room one last time and then sits down on the floor apparently resigned to his fate of never getting out while the band's song is reprised in the background.

Cast
Richard Schaal as The Man in the Cube
Hugh Webster as Arnie
Rex Sevenoaks as Mr. Thomas
Jack Van Evera as Himself/Watson
John Granik as Straight Comic, Police Sergeant
Guy Sanvido as Comic, Officer Fritz
Eliza Creighton as Cora
Don Crawford as Black Militant
Jerry Nelson as Monk
Sandra Scott as Miss Bix
Claude Rae as Dr. Connors
Don McGill as Professor
Ralph Endersby as Guitarist
Trudy Young as Liza 1
Ruth Springford as Liza 2
Moe Margolese as Dr. Bingham, Father-In-Law
Alice Hill as Mother-In-Law, Mrs. Stratton
Lolo Farell as Margaret
William Osler as Scientist
Eric Clavering as Dr. Bradowski, Old Man
Jean Christopher as Nurse
Jerry Juhl as Pipe-Smoking Party Guest
Jim Henson as Gorillas (voice)

Adaptations
In 2007, the German Fringe Theater troupe Glassbooth presented a live stage adaptation of The Cube titled KUBUS, directed by Roger Hoffmann and starring Jens Dornheim.

In 2012, Tale of Sand, a graphic novel co-written by Henson and Juhl, was released utilizing similar set pieces and sight gags. Although released long after The Cube, the script for Tale of Sand actually predates it by several years.

References

External links
 
 The Cube review

1969 films
Television shows directed by Jim Henson
American television films
Television anthology episodes
Television shows written by Jerry Juhl
Television shows written by Jim Henson